François Colimon (10 July 1934 – 4 November 2022) was a Haitian Roman Catholic prelate.

Colimon was born in Haiti and was ordained to the priesthood in 1962. He served as coadjutor bishop of the Roman Catholic Diocese of Port-de-Paix from 1978 to 1982 and then served as the bishop of the diocese from 1982 until his resignation in 2008.

References

1934 births
2022 deaths
Haitian Roman Catholic bishops
Bishops appointed by Pope John Paul II
People from Port-de-Paix